Carlos is a 1971 West German Western television film, which has transplanted the story of Friedrich Schiller's play Don Carlos from 16th century Spain to a 1915 American Western style environment. According to some, the setting should be somewhere in southern Europe, while others claim it is somewhere in the southwestern United States. Due to complicated contracts and shooting problems, it never had the theatrical release that was intended, and was instead shown on German TV.

It was directed by Hans W. Geißendörfer, who also wrote the screenplay, and stars Gottfried John and Anna Karina. The film was shot in Eilat in Israel, with several Israelis participating in smaller roles and as extras.

Cast
 Bernhard Wicki as Philipp
 Gottfried John as Carlos
 Anna Karina as Clara
 Geraldine Chaplin as Lisa
 Horst Frank as Ligo
 Thomas Hunter as Pedro
  as Enrico (as Sabi Dor)
 Ebba Kaiser
 Lorenza Colville as Roswitha
 Shaike Ophir as Domingo
 Reuven Shefer as Tassos
 Shmuel Wolf as Mönch
 Joseph Shiloach as Mario (as Yossi Shiloah)
 Leon Charney as Col

References

External links

1971 films
1971 Western (genre) films
Films based on works by Friedrich Schiller
West German films
1970s German-language films
German Western (genre) films
German films based on plays
Films shot in Israel
Films directed by Hans W. Geißendörfer
1970s German films